Alpha 66 is an anti-Castro paramilitary organization. The group was originally formed by Cuban exiles in the early 1960s and was most active in the late 1970s and 1980s. Its activities declined in the 1980s. Historian Alan McPherson describes it as a terrorist organization.

History

Foundation
Alpha 66 was founded by Cuban exiles in the early 1960s to act as an anti-Castro, paramilitary group. Although it has undergone changes in personnel and leadership, it still exists today and is based out of Florida. Alpha 66 was most active during the late 1970s and early 1980s, but remains active in the Miami area. At the height of its power, Alpha 66 operated at a level similar to Abdala, Brigade 2506, Omega 7, and the FLNC (Cuban National Liberation Front) amongst other Cuban-exile paramilitary groups. It claimed to have sixty-three chapters in operation during 1977.

Like other paramilitary groups composed of Cuban exiles who emigrated after the fall of the Batista regime, Alpha 66 presented itself as a conservative, ultra-nationalistic, patriotic organization that wished to undo Fidel Castro's revolutionary government. Alpha 66's founding members included many Cubans who had fought as revolutionaries against the Batista government alongside Fidel Castro, and Alpha 66's anthem directly references Fidel Castro as having betrayed the ideals that the group's members originally fought for. Alpha 66's anti-communist rhetoric and staunch opposition to the Cuban government earned it the overwhelming support of the Miami exile community as well as the sympathy of an overtly anti-communist attitude in American politics.

Alpha 66 had multiple founders including Eloy Gutiérrez Menoyo, who had served twenty years in a Cuban prison for counterrevolutionary activities, and Antonio Veciana. Early on, some members of Alpha 66 also partook in the United States-sponsored Volunteer Program, which allowed Cuban exiles to form all-Cuban military units within the United States Army. A 1964 FBI memo confirmed that Veciana, Menoyo and Sargen were all assets of US Army intelligence. Additionally, members of Alpha 66 received limited funding and training from the CIA; however, this support did not last. The CIA found that it had little control over the actions of Alpha 66 and, in many cases, Alpha 66 carried out operations without the CIA's approval or consultation, leading to the CIA ending its involvement with the group, which in turn caused many Alpha 66 members to become disillusioned with the United States government for its lack of support. Despite the lack of government support, Alpha 66 still managed to train its members throughout the everglades of Florida.

Evolution

As hope for a United States-led invasion of Cuba died down amongst exiles, a growing number of Cuban exiles began to promote reconciliation between the United States and Cuba as well as peaceful methods of change within Cuba. In Alpha 66's case, some members broke off and started a group known as Cambio Cubano (Cuban Change). Notably, Gutierrez Menoyo and Antonio Veciana became strong advocates for national dialogue between Cuba and the United States. By 1974, most Cuban exiles figured that the Cuban government could not be overthrown by a militant group and instead decided to support cooperation between the United States and Cuba. The Cuban exiles were labeled “dialogueros” as opposed to the “hardliners” who still wished to overthrow Cuba's communist regime and the Castro government by force. One Miami Herald poll found that only twenty-eight percent of the Cuban exile population in the area supported dialogue between the United States and the Castro government.

Although the United States was originally unable to halt Alpha 66's terrorist operations due to issues arising between United States Customs and the Department of Justice, there were other reasons for its lack of action on the issue of Alpha 66. At the time of Alpha 66's founding, the United States was committed to overthrowing Fidel Castro's communist government, which further complicated the efforts of the United States to stop Alpha 66's activities because both actors were momentarily aligned in their goal. However, as time passed, and tensions eased between the United States and Cuba, the United States government began to specifically target paramilitary exile groups and other terrorist cells, making clear its lack of support for the illegal activities that many militants attempted to undertake. By the 1980s, the United States organized special task forces to further crack down on the terrorist activities of groups like Alpha 66. This, and the growing support for the “dialogueros” movement, led most Cuban exile paramilitary organizations to breakup by the mid 1980s.

Contemporary
Although Alpha 66's power began to wane in the early 1980s, it never formally disbanded and still maintains a weak presence in the Southern United States. As late as 1995, Alpha 66 members claimed to be launching "drive-by" attacks on Cuban tourist beaches. The Miami area is home to some of the last active Alpha 66 cells. There are many Alpha 66 websites in operation today, however; most are old and have not been updated since the 1990s or early 2000s. One such website can be found in the "External References" section of this page. Alpha 66's doctrine of violent change in Cuba has largely been overturned in favor a peaceful reforms and coexistence between the Cuban government and Cuban exiles. Alpha 66 has no official sponsor, nor is there an official figurehead for the group. The end of the Cold War, death of Fidel Castro, and warming of relations between the United States and Cuba has made Alpha 66's reason for existing largely nonexistent, especially when paired with the change in popular opinion as to how to bring about change in Cuba.

See also

 Cuban Power
 Omega 7

References

External References 

 Released CIA document referencing Alpha 66
 One of the many outdated "Alpha 66" websites
 1990s news program interviewing Alpha 66

Cuba–United States relations
Opposition to Fidel Castro
Terrorism in the United States
Paramilitary organizations based in the United States
Anti-communist terrorism
Terrorism in Cuba
Anti-communist organizations in the United States
Right-wing militia organizations in the United States
1961 establishments in Florida
Organizations based in Miami